Cauz is a surname. Notable people with this surname include:

 Cristian Cauz (born 1996), Italian football player
 Francesca Cauz (born 1992), Italian racing cyclist
 Jorge Cauz, American businessman of Mexican descent